On 12 October 2021, a bus carrying 45 passengers from Nepalgunj to Gamgadhi in Nepal, fell into a river in Chhayanath Rara Municipality, killing 32 people including the driver.

Accident 
On Monday 11 October, a passenger bus carrying 45 passengers was heading to Gamgadhi, Mugu District from Nepalgunj, Banke District. Most of the people on the bus were migrant workers and students returning home to celebrate Dashain, a major Hindu festival in Nepal. On Tuesday 12 October, when the bus reached Chhayanath Rara, it fell 300 meters down into a river, Pinatapane Khola, killing 24 people on the spot and critically injuring 18 people. Nepali Army arrived at the scene to rescue and fly the injured passengers to various hospitals in Nepal including in Mugu, Kohalpur, and Nepalgunj. Four people died at the Rara Airport while being rescued, and the other four people died while undergoing treatments in Nepalgunj.

Aftermath 

It is unclear how the bus fell into the river, some officials say it was due to a tyre puncture, and others say failure of brakes.

References 

Mugu bus accident
Mugu bus accident
Bus incidents in Nepal
October 2021 events in Asia
Mugu District
2021 disasters in Nepal